Tung Wah Group of Hospitals Li Ka Shing College is an aided secondary school in Hong Kong, founded in 1982. It is the twelfth secondary school established by Tung Wah Group of Hospitals. The school is located in Cheung Wah Estate, Fanling.

Donor 
Li Ka-shing, renowned Hong Kong business magnate, investor and philanthropist, made significant donations to construct the school's campus in 1982 and upgrade the school's facilities, including air-conditioning system of the school hall, in 1997. In 2006, Li made another donation to build a new annex for the school and improve its facilities and equipment. Hence, the school was named after him.

List of principals

House 
There are currently 4 houses.

The originally consisting 8 houses is merged into 4 in school year 2018–2019.
The students in the eliminated houses in year 2017–2018 are now assigned to the corresponding houses shown on the table above.

Academic

Subjects offered

Junior Form 
The former principal, Mr CHUNG Chiang Hon, has started to offer English Literature and English Enrichment Programme and provide Media English in 2004 in order to put emphasis on English. Due to the Fine-tuning of Medium of Instruction for Secondary Schools starting from 2010, the medium of instruction in F.1 has been changed to English.

Old Senior Secondary 
There were 5 classes each form in form 4 and form 5, namely, 1 Art stream class, 2 Commerce stream classes and 2 Science stream classes. Generally, students from A and E took 8 HKCEE subjects and those from B, C, D take 7. The last class of F.5 taking HKCEE ended in 2010.

There are 2 classes in each form in forms 6 and 7, namely, Art and Commerce class and Science class. Students can select 3AL, 2AL+2AS, 2AL+1AS as their HKALE subjects apart from Chinese Language and Culture and Use of English.

*Advance Supplementary Level(AS)Subject
#Both Advance Supplementary Level(ASL)and Advance Level(AL)options offered 
Note:Starting from 2007, students from Art and Commerce stream can take computer Application;those from Science stream can take 1 commerce subject.

New Senior Secondary(NSS) curriculum 
Starting from 2009, T.W.G.Hs Li Ka Shing College offers the new senior secondary course.

Notable people 
Warwick Wan Wo Tat (2008–2011 District Councillor in North District Council)
Wallis Pang (Hong Kong actress)

Student Union 
2022-2023 Libra (301 votes)

External links 

Official website
The page about this school on the site of Li Ka Shing Foundation
Official website of T.W.G.Hs Li Ka Shing College Alumni Association

Fanling
Li Ka Shing College
Li Ka Shing College
Secondary schools in Hong Kong